Alvíssmál (Old Norse: 'The Song of All-wise' or 'The Words of All-wise') is a poem collected in the Poetic Edda, probably dating to the 12th century, that describes how the god Thor outwits a dwarf called Alvíss ("All-Wise") who seeks to marry his daughter.

Plot
Alvíss comes to Thor to claim Thor's daughter as his bride, saying that she had been promised to him earlier. Thor refuses as he had not been at home at the time, then tells Alvíss that he may take the young woman if he can correctly answer all of Thor's questions.  The dwarf's replies act as an exhaustive list of the sentient mythological entities among men, Æsir, Vanir, jötnar, dwarfs, and elves. For example, the heavens have the following names, according to Alvíss:

Ultimately, Thor confesses he was asking the questions to gain some time for the sun to rise and turn the dwarf into stone.

Dating
It is not known when Alvíssmál was created; analysis of its contents can point to multiple periods depending on which elements are focused upon.  One theory is that the use of Thor and references to mythical beings can be assumed to reflect the culture's religious beliefs, so it would have been created no later than the 10th century before Iceland was Christianized.  Another points to the presence of words found only in late skaldic poetry, which would indicate that it came from the 12th-century skaldic poetry revival.

References

Bibliography

External links

English translation
Alvissmol Translation and commentary by Henry Adams Bellows

English translation with Old Norse  
Alvissmal The poem in the 12th Poetic Edda in the Codex Regius, broken down into 5 stanza segments so that the Old Norse can match the English translations

Old Norse editions
Alvíssmál Sophus Bugge's edition of the manuscript text
Alvíssmál Guðni Jónsson's edition with normalized spelling

Images
MyNDIR (My Norse Digital Image Repository) illustrations of Alvissmál by W.G. Collingwood from Olive Bray's The Elder or Poetic Edda (1908). Clicking on a thumbnail brings up the full image and information concerning it.

Sources of Norse mythology
Eddic poetry